John Crofts was an English politician who sat in the House of Commons  in 1653 and in 1656. He fought in the Parliamentary army in the English Civil War.

Crofts was of Nether Swell, near Stow-on-the-Wold, Gloucestershire. His origins are obscure, but he may have been the brother of James Crofts, Sheriff of Bristol. He was an active captain in the Parliamentary army during the Civil War.

In 1653, Crofts was elected Member of Parliament for Gloucestershire in the Barebones Parliament. He was re-elected MP for Gloucestershire in 1656 for the Second Protectorate Parliament. He was captain of the militia in Gloucestershire in 1659. In 1662 he was removed from the Common Council of Tewkesbury.
 
Crofts married Anne Waterworth, a widow and daughter of Sir William Leigh of Longborow.

References

 

Year of birth missing
Year of death missing
Roundheads
English MPs 1653 (Barebones)
English MPs 1656–1658
Politicians from Gloucestershire